Alakilise or Church of the Angel Gabriel is a church ruin in Lycia, Turkey near Finike and Demre in Antalya Province. It is situated ca. 860 meter above sea-level at the southern flanks of Alaca Dağ. Now only one of the walls of the church stands. The church has served a sizeable village that probably was founded in the sixth century. The church itself is a sixth-century basilica which was rebuilt in the ninth century.

It is on the Lycian Way long-distance footpath.

References 
 
 Erik Petersen, Waymarking af The Lycian Way. Den første langdistance

Archaeological sites in the Mediterranean Region, Turkey
Antalya Province